David McIver (24 August 1840 – 1 September 1907) was an English steam ship owner and a Conservative politician who sat in the House of Commons in two periods between 1874 and 1907.

MacIver was the eldest son of Charles MacIver of Calderstone, Allerton near Liverpool, and his wife Mary Ann Morrison, daughter of D Morrison of Glasgow. He was educated at the Royal Institution School, Liverpool. From 1863 he was a partner in the firm of D and C MacIver who were managing owners of the Cunard Steamship Company. He was chairman of the Liverpool Steamship Owners Association and President of the American Chamber of Commerce. He was also a director of the Great Western Railway. He was a major in the 11th Lancashire Artillery Volunteers, an alderman  and a J.P. for Liverpool. He was also commodore of the Royal Mersey Yacht Club.

In 1874 McIver was elected Member of Parliament for Birkenhead. He held the seat until 1885. In 1898 he was elected MP for Liverpool Kirkdale and held the seat until his death aged 67 in 1907.

McIver married firstly Anne Rankin daughter of Robert Rankin of Bromborough and after her death in 1869 he married Edith Eleanor Squarey daughter of A T Squarey of Bebington.

References

External links
 

1840 births
1907 deaths
Conservative Party (UK) MPs for English constituencies
UK MPs 1880–1885
UK MPs 1895–1900
UK MPs 1900–1906
UK MPs 1906–1910
British businesspeople in shipping
People from Allerton
Directors of the Great Western Railway
People educated at the Royal Institution School
Businesspeople from Liverpool
19th-century English businesspeople